The Bureau of Censorship was a bureau set up in the Ministry of Education of the Russian Empire following the passage of an enabling law on July 9, 1804.

The censorship statute read, in part:

The central committee of censorship was the St. Petersburg Censorship Committee, which reported directly to the trustees of the St. Petersburg school district. Censorship committees were also established in Moscow, Vilnius, and Tartu, and later in other districts. All printed material and manuscripts were subject to the bureau's oversight and approval.

 	
The Ministry of Education's Bureau of Censorship, in addition to censoring certain material, reported the authors to the Third Section of His Imperial Majesty's Own Chancellery – "Section Three", the secret police, who monitored potential subversives. (Section Three also had the power to censor authors and writings even if they had been approved by the Bureau of Censorship.)

References

Censorship in Russia
Law in the Russian Empire
19th century in the Russian Empire